Selangor is the most developed state in Malaysia but it still retains approximately 30% of its land cover under natural forest. Several nature sites in Selangor are of particular interest for conservation and recreation.

Selangor, with an area of approximately 8,000 km2, extends along the west coast of Peninsular Malaysia at the northern outlet of the Straits of Malacca. Its advantageous geographic position and rich natural resources have made Selangor the most prosperous state in Malaysia. Today it has the distinction of being the most populated state in Malaysia, with about 3.75 million inhabitants. A large proportion of Selangor's population lives around the Federal Territory of Kuala Lumpur, though the balance is now shifting towards its new capital, Shah Alam.

"Kuala Selangor Nature Park is situated at the mouth of Selangor River , in the state of Selangor , Malaysia. It covers approximately 800 acres of mangroves and mudflats and is the home to various wildlife such as otters, monkeys, birds, mudskippers and crabs." 
The Kuala Selangor Nature Park is managed by the Malaysian Nature Society, under a co-operative arrangement with the Selangor State Government.

References

External links
 Nature Escapes Website
 Selangor Birders Website
 Selangor Branch of Malaysian Nature Society
Kuala Selangor Nature Park

 
Nature sites of Malaysia
Geography of Selangor